Michelle Maylene (born January 20, 1987) is an actress, adult model, and former adult film star.

Early life
Maylene was born in Edwards, California. She is of French Hawaiian & Filipino descent.

Career
Maylene made her debut as a featured dancer in 2006. Her mother was also an exotic dancer.

Between 2007 and 2010, Maylene co-starred as "Karen" in all four seasons of the Cinemax softcore-sitcom Co-Ed Confidential.

Maylene appeared on Jenna Jameson’s American Sex Star and was a finalist on the first season. She has appeared on Playboy TV's Night Calls and Canoga Park, and, as of 2008, she was a news correspondent on the Adult Video News video website AVNLive.com.

Maylene portrayed the role of "Esha", in an episode called "Downtime", in the 2011 Cinemax television series Chemistry.

In 2011, Complex magazine ranked her at #28 on their list of "The Top 50 Hottest Asian Porn Stars of All Time."

Personal life
She was once engaged to actor Marcus Patrick.

Awards and nominations
 2005 XRCO Award nominee – Cream Dream
 2007 AVN Award nominee – Best New Starlet
 2008 AVN Award nominee – Best Crossover Star
 2018 Urban X Hall of Fame

References

External links

 
 
 
 

1987 births
Living people
American pornographic film actresses
Pornographic film actors from California
21st-century American women